G H Patel College of Engineering and Technology (GCET) is an engineering college in Vallabh Vidyanagar, Gujarat, India. GCET is named after Shri Gordhanbhai Hathibhai Patel, a philanthropist of Gujarat. Established in 1996 to provide undergraduate level technical education, GCET is also involved in industrial consultancy.  GCET is affiliated with the CVM University.

Organisation and administration  
Management includes C.L. Patel (Chairman, Charotar Vidya Mandal), P. B. Patel (CMD, Elecon), BG Patel (Vice Chancellor, Sardar Patel University), Anil Kane (Chairman, Indian Wind Energy Association), Chairman, AICTE (All India Council for Technical Education) and Director of Technical Education (Gujarat State) and the present Principal of the College is H.B.Soni who was formerly Head of the Department of Electronic and Communication department.

Academics

University affiliations 
GCET was affiliated with Sardar Patel University (SPU) between 1996 and 2008 later from 2008-2020 it was affiliated to GTU, Now it is under the CVM University by Charutar Vidya Mandal. The college offers 419 seats in respective engineering branches and one of the best modern infrastructure available in any engineering college in Gujarat. It has the largest Auditorium in Anand district with the seating capacity of more than 400 people with fully air conditioned facility.

Academic programmes
Undergraduate 
  Chemical Engineering
  Civil Engineering
  Computer Engineering
  Electrical Engineering
  Electronics and Communications Engineering
  Information Technology
  Mechanical Engineering
  Mechatronics Engineering
  Applied Science and Humanities

Post graduate 
 Chemical Engineering
 Communication Engineering
 Embedded Systems
 IT engineering
 Mechanical Engineering
 Mechatronics
 Power Systems

Industry Collaboration & Activities 
 IEEE GCET Student Branch
 Industrial Consultancy Cell
 ISTE Chapter (Indian Society for Technical Education)
 GCET Prarambh Club
 Society of Power Engineers, Vallabh Vidyanagar Chapter
 IIChE Chapter (Indian Institute Of Chemical Engineers)
International Society of Automation  (ISA) Student Chapter
 RasayanShakti (The Group Of Chemical Engineers)
 ASME Chapter (American Society of Mechanical Engineers)
 GCET Talk and Year Book Department along with Language Club
 GCET Language Club
 TEDxGCET - TEDx talks

Ranking 
In 2013, GCET was ranked at number 53, at number 42 in 2014 and at number 28 in 2015 among the Top 100 Engineering Colleges of India by DataQuest. In 2006, GCET was named as one of the top 100 engineering schools in India by Outlook.

References

External links
 

Engineering colleges in Gujarat
Education in Anand district